Sayed Hashem Ahmed, better known as Tekken Master, is a professional esports player. He is largely credited with popularizing the esports industry in the Persian Gulf.

Hashem is also known for being recognized by the King of Bahrain Hamad bin Isa Al Khalifa following his win at the Brasil Game Show Tournament for Mortal Kombat 11 game in 2019.

He is also notable for being given the accolade of "the best in the Middle East." by his peers at the Tekken Tag Tournament 2 Middle East Championship in Dubai.

Hashem, under the name Tekken Master, is sponsored by NASR ESPORTS.

Early years 
The youngest of four, Hashem began playing video games when he was six years old. He showed interest for fighting games early on, inspired by his older brothers.

Professional career 
Hashem's professional career began in 2010 when he won the 2v2 Tekken 6 Tournament in Kuwait.

In 2012, he was acclaimed to be "best in the Middle East" at the Tekken Tag Tournament 2 Middle East Championship in Dubai. This allowed entry to the Electronic Sports World Cup 2012 Tekken Tag Tournament 2 in France.

In 2015 he won the PLG Mortal Kombat Middle East Cup. In the same year, he was the first Arab player to participate in the Mortal Kombat X European Finals in Paris where he finished second. Hashem was granted entry by the Power League Gaming PLG to participate at Evo 2016, where he finished second.

In 2017, Hashem participated in several Injustice 2 tournaments and finished 3rd in the Eleague Injustice 2 World Championship.

In 2018 he competed in a variety of tournaments playing including Viennality 2018, Tekken 7 and Injustice 2.

In 2019 won the Brazil Game Show 2019 of Mortal Kombat 11. Following the victory, Hashem was dignified by the King of Bahrain. Hashem was then ranked 3rd on the Mortal Kombat Pro Series overall leaderboard of 2019.

In 2020, Hashem won the Mortal Kombat players in the WePlay Dragon Temple event in Kyiv.

In 2021, Hashem continued winning and defended his championship, but lost in the grand final coming in second place . In 2021 at the finals of the online Mortal Kombat Pro Competition he placed 1st, beating vWsym in the Grand finals. Hashem was also invited to Saudi Arabia for the Mortal Kombat 11 tournament, called Rush, in October 2021 and placed 1st.

References 

Fighting game players
Bahraini people
1995 births
Living people